James Bernard Zeravich (February 17, 1920 – August 16, 1998) was an American professional basketball player. He played for the Syracuse Nationals in the National Basketball League during the 1946–47 season. He also played in the Amateur Athletic Union for numerous squads.

References

1920 births
1998 deaths
Amateur Athletic Union men's basketball players
Basketball players from Chicago
Centers (basketball)
Chicago American Gears players
Syracuse Nationals players
Washington & Jefferson Presidents men's basketball players
American men's basketball players